Fransiskus Xaverius Sukendar Wignyosumarta (born 8 August 1964) was the Vicar General of the Archdiocese of Semarang. Before that, he was an Episcopal Vicar of Semarang and a Parish Priest of Semarang Cathedral.

Early career
Sukendar was baptisized with the name Fransiskus Xaverius on September 1964 in Banteng Church, Yogyakarta. His mother died in 1981 and his father died in 1999.

He was ordained to the priesthood in 1992 by the incumbent Archbishop of Semarang, Julius Darmaatmadja. After that, he was ordered to serve at St. St. Mary of the Assumption Church, Klaten as a curate until 1995. After that, he served at Minor Seminary of Mertoyudan, Magelang until 2003. In 2003, Sukendar was appointed to serve at Sragen, staying until 2008.

Archdiocese of Semarang
Sukendar was appointed Episcopal Vicar of Semarang and as a parish priest of Semarang Cathedral on August 15, 2008, replacing Julius Sukardi. Semarang Cathedral was located near Tugu Muda Monument, in what became the city's downtown area. His leadership at Semarang Cathedral ended on August 26, 2012.

On August 6, 2012, Sukendar was appointed Vicar General of Archdiocese of Semarang, taking the position on August 26, 2012.

See also

References

1964 births
Living people
Indonesian Roman Catholic priests
Javanese people